Tadeusz Pawlusiak (9 August 1946 – 16 April 2011) was a Polish ski jumper. He competed at the 1972 Winter Olympics and the 1976 Winter Olympics.

References

1946 births
2011 deaths
Polish male ski jumpers
Olympic ski jumpers of Poland
Ski jumpers at the 1972 Winter Olympics
Ski jumpers at the 1976 Winter Olympics
People from Bielsko County
20th-century Polish people